Mahindra International School, formerly known as Mercedes-Benz International School, is situated in Hinjawadi, a suburb of Pune, Maharashtra, India. One of India's oldest International Baccalaureate (IB) schools, they are authorized by the IB to offer all the three programmes - IB Primary Years Programme, IB Middle Years Programme and IB Diploma Programme. MBIS was founded in 1998 and has celebrated over 20 years in international education. 
The School is also accredited by the Council of International Schools and US New England Association of Schools and Colleges (NEASC).

The Director of the school is Joel Cohen. The Head of Secondary School is Mr. Oliver Chua and the Head of the Primary School is Helen Sharrock.

Organisations Associated 
CIS: Council for International Schools

IB: International Baccalaureate

NEASC: New England Association of Schools and Colleges

IB Programmes 
The Primary Years Programme is provided for children in the Primary school (3 – 11 years).
The Middle Years Programme is provided for students in the Secondary School (11 – 16 years).
The Diploma Programme provides the final two years of education (16 – 18 years).

See also 
List of schools in Pune

References

External links 
School website

High schools and secondary schools in Maharashtra
International Baccalaureate schools in India
Schools in Pune
1998 establishments in Maharashtra
Educational institutions established in 1998